Roussos A. Koundouros (Agios Nikolaos, 1891 – October 29, 1944) was a Greek lawyer and politician who was executed by the Germans for his involvement in the Cretan Resistance.

References

1891 births
Greek Resistance members
Crete in World War II
Cretan Resistance
1944 deaths
Greek people executed by Nazi Germany
People from Agios Nikolaos, Crete